The Eye is the eleventh studio album by the Swiss electronic duo Yello. It was released on 9 December 2003 on Motor Music.

Track listing
 "Planet Dada"
 "Nervous"
 "Don Turbulento"
 "Soul On Ice"
 "Junior B"
 "Tiger Dust"
 "Distant Solution"
 "Hipster's Delay"
 "Time Palace"
 "Indigo Bay"
 "Unreal"
 "Bougainville"
 "Star Breath"
 "Planet Dada [Flamboyant]"

Personnel
Composed, arranged, and engineered by Boris Blank 
Lyrics, vocals by Dieter Meier 
Mastered by Christoph Stickel 
Cover Design by Martin Wanner 
Photography by Beat Pfändler 
Producer – Yello

Charts

References

2003 albums
Yello albums